Thomas Gray (24 July 1875–1944) was an English footballer who played in the Football League for Bury and Gainsborough Trinity.

References

1875 births
1944 deaths
English footballers
Association football forwards
English Football League players
Gainsborough Trinity F.C. players
Birmingham City F.C. players
Gillingham F.C. players
Queens Park Rangers F.C. players
Bury F.C. players